One third of St Albans City and District Council in England is elected each year, followed by one year without election.

Political control
Since the first election to the council in 1973 political control of the council has been held by the following parties:

Leadership
The leaders of the council since 2004 have been:

Council elections
Summary of the council composition after each council elections, click on the year for full details of each election. Boundary changes took place for the 1999 election increasing the number of seats by 1.

Notes:

District result maps

By-election results
By-elections occur when seats become vacant between council elections. Below is a summary of recent by-elections; full by-election results can be found by clicking on the by-election name.

References

External links
St Albans City and District Council

 
Elections